Black Empire may refer to:

 Black Empire (novel), a 1938 speculative fiction novel by George S. Schuyler
 Black Empire (Anthem album)

See also
Black Emperor (disambiguation)
The Black Vampire, a 1953 Argentine film